Van Brussel is a surname. Notable people with the surname include:

Hendrik Van Brussel (born 1944), Belgian mechanical engineer
Henk van Brussel (1936–2007), Dutch footballer and manager
Hermanus van Brussel (1763–1815), Dutch painter and engraver
Marianne Van Brussel, Belgian paralympic athlete
Paul Theodor van Brussel (1754–1795), Dutch painter

Surnames of Dutch origin